Luca Mazzitelli (born 15 November 1995) is an Italian professional footballer who plays as a midfielder for  club Frosinone, on loan from Monza.

Club career

Roma and loans 
Mazzitelli is a youth exponent from Roma. He made his Serie A debut on 18 May 2014 in a 1-0 away defeat against Genoa.

On 10 July 2015, Mazzitelli was loaned out from Roma to Brescia in search of more playing time. Mazzitelli experience with Brescia was successful due to him being the first choice Central Midfield from the beginning of the season. He then was able to put on great displays on the pitch and gained attention from clubs in the first division.

Sassuolo and loans 
On 1 February 2016, Sassuolo confirmed the permanent signing of Mazzitelli from Roma for €3.5 million; the player will however remain on loan with Brescia until 30 June 2016.

On 17 May 2016, Sassuolo DS Giovanni Carnevali confirmed that Luca Mazzitelli will be part of Sassuolo first team squad for the 2016-17 season.

On 6 July 2018, Mazzitelli signed with Genoa until 30 June 2019 a loan with an obligation to buy.

On 15 January 2020, he joined Serie B club Virtus Entella on loan until the end of 2019–20 season. If certain conditions were met, Entella would be obligated to purchase his rights at the end of the loan.

On 25 September 2020, he moved to Serie B club Pisa on loan with an obligation to buy.

Monza 
On 9 July 2021, joined fellow-Serie B side Monza on a four-year contract. He made his debut on 11 September, in a 1–1 league draw against SPAL. On 28 October, Mazzitelli scored his first goal for Monza in a 1–1 away draw to Vicenza.

Loan to Frosinone 
On 23 August 2022, Mazzitelli was sent on a one-year loan to Frosinone, with conditional obligation for purchase.

International career
On 24 March 2016, he made his debut with the Italy U21 team, in a qualification match against Republic of Ireland.

Career statistics

Club

References

1995 births
Living people
Footballers from Rome
Italian footballers
Association football midfielders
A.S. Roma players
F.C. Südtirol players
Brescia Calcio players
U.S. Sassuolo Calcio players
Genoa C.F.C. players
Virtus Entella players
Pisa S.C. players
A.C. Monza players
Frosinone Calcio players
Serie A players
Serie B players
Serie C players
Italy youth international footballers
Italy under-21 international footballers